Kırkgeçit Tunnels (literally "Forty-Passes tunnels") are a series of seven motorway tunnels crossing the Taurus Mountains on the province border of Niğde and Adana, Turkey.

The tunnels are located on the Ankara-Tarsus motorway   between Kemerhisar and Pozantı connecting the Central Anatolia Region with the Mediterranean Region. Five of the tunnels in the north are in Niğde Province while the remaining two are situated in Adana Province. All the seven tunnels are twin bores and carry three lanes of traffic in each direction. 16 viaducts named Kırkgeçit Viaducts connect the tunnels in series. Dangerous goods carriers are not permitted to use the tunnels. The Çakıt Tunnel follows the Kırkgeçit-7 Tunnel in direction Pozantı.

The tunnels were constructed as part of the motorway O-21 and were opened to traffic on March 12, 2009. The tunnels allow the travel time of the passage through the mountainous terrain drop from one-and-half hours before to 20 minutes. A saving of 110 million annually is calculated for the national economy. The tunnels enable a through-traffic on motorways from the Bulgarian border Kapıkule to the border crossings to Syria and Iraq.

See also
 List of motorway tunnels in Turkey
 Çakıt Tunnel

References

External links

Road tunnels in Turkey
Tunnels completed in 2009
Buildings and structures in Niğde Province
Buildings and structures in Adana Province